The 2014 Manitoba Scotties Tournament of Hearts, the provincial women's curling championship for Manitoba, was held from January 8 to 12 at the Tundra Oil & Gas Place in Virden. The winning Chelsea Carey team went on to represent Manitoba at the 2014 Scotties Tournament of Hearts in Montreal.

Teams
The teams are listed as follows:

Round-robin standings
Final round-robin standings

Round-robin results
All draw times are listed in Central Standard Time (UTC−6).

Draw 1
Wednesday, January 8, 8:30 am

Draw 2
Wednesday, January 8, 12:15 pm

Draw 3
Wednesday, January 8, 4:30 pm

Draw 4
Wednesday, January 8, 8:15 pm

Draw 5
Thursday, January 9, 8:30 am

Draw 6
Thursday, January 9, 12:15 pm

Draw 7
Thursday, January 9, 4:00 pm

Draw 8
Thursday, January 9, 7:45 pm

Draw 9
Friday, January 10, 8:30 am

Draw 10
Friday, January 10, 12:15 pm

Draw 11
Friday, January 10, 4:00 pm

Draw 12
Friday, January 10, 7:45 pm

Draw 13
Saturday, January 11, 8:30 am

Draw 14
Saturday, January 11, 12:15 pm

Tiebreaker
Saturday, January 11, 2:00 pm

Playoffs

R1 vs. B1
Saturday, January 11, 6:00 pm

R2 vs. B2
Saturday, January 11, 8:30 pm

Semifinal
Sunday, January 12, 11:30 am

Final
Sunday, January 12, 4:00 pm

References

External links

Curling in Manitoba
Manitoba
Manitoba Scotties Tournament of Hearts
2014 in Manitoba